The 22861 / 22862 Rajya Rani  Express is an Express  train belonging to Indian Railways South Eastern Railway zone that runs between  and  in India.This train is a part of Rajya Rani Express series from West Bengal state. But in 2022 the 22861/22862 is the train no. of Howrah - Kantabanji Ispat express

It operates as train number 22861 from Shalimar to Adra Junction and as train number 22862 in the reverse direction, serving the states of  West Bengal.

Coaches
The 22861 / 62 Rajya Rani  Express has eight general unreserved & two SLR (seating with luggage rake) coaches . It does not carry a pantry car.

As is customary with most train services in India, coach composition may be amended at the discretion of Indian Railways depending on demand.

Service

Routing

Traction
As the route is electrified, a -based WAP-4 / WAP-7 electric locomotive pulls the train to its destination.

References

External links
22861 Rajya Rani  Express at India Rail Info
22862 Rajya Rani  Express at India Rail Info

Railway services introduced in 2011
Rajya Rani Express trains
Rail transport in Howrah
Rail transport in West Bengal